Joyo Velarde is a Filipino hip hop and soul singer. Her husband is Lyrics Born. She has been featured on numerous tracks by the Quannum Projects cohorts.

Career
Joyo Velarde's self-titled EP, Joyo Velarde, was released in May 2009.

She released the first studio album, Love and Understanding, in February 2010. It was produced by Lyrics Born, Jake One, and Headnodic, among others.

Style and influences
Joyo Velarde stated that Chaka Khan and Minnie Ripperton influenced her music.

Discography

Studio albums
 Love and Understanding (2010)

Mixtapes
 Hey Love (2008)

EPs
 Joyo Velarde (2009)

Singles
 "Sweet Angels" (2001)

Guest appearances
 Latyrx - "Balcony Beach" from Latyrx (1997)
 Lyrics Born - "Love Me So Bad" from Later That Day (2003)
 Lyrics Born - "Over You" and "I Can't Wait for Your Love" from Same !@$ Different Day (2005)
 Lyrics Born - "I've Lost Myself" from As U Were (2010)
 Latyrx - "Nebula's Eye" from The Second Album (2013)

References

External links

 
 

1974 births
Living people
People from El Cerrito, California
Quannum Projects artists
American musicians of Filipino descent
University of California, Davis alumni